The Empresa Metropolitana de Transportes Urbanos de São Paulo, or EMTU, is a company owned by the Secretaria de Estado dos Transportes Metropolitanos (STM). Created in 1977, it is responsible for the transport, by bus, of 5 million people in the Greater São Paulo area.

See also
 São Paulo Metro
 Companhia Paulista de Trens Metropolitanos - São Paulo's Metropolitan Train Company
 SPTrans - São Paulo Transport
 Trolleybuses in São Paulo

References

External links

  Official page of EMTU

Empresa Metropolitana de Transportes Urbanos de São Paulo
Transport companies established in 1977